Aiguamúrcia is a municipality, located in the province of Tarragona, Catalonia (northern Spain), in the Alt Camp comarca.

The Monastery of Santes Creus is located within the commune's territory.

References

External links 

Official website
 Info
 Government data pages 

Municipalities in Alt Camp
Populated places in Alt Camp